Larbi Tabti (born 23 April 1993, in Oran) is an Algerian footballer who plays for Algerian Ligue Professionnelle 1 club ES Sétif as a midfielder.

Career 
In 2019, he signed a contract with CR Belouizdad.
In 2022, he signed a contract with ES Sétif.

Honours

Club
USM Bel Abbès
 Algerian Cup: 2018

References

External links

1993 births
Footballers from Oran
Living people
Association football midfielders
Algerian footballers
USM Bel Abbès players
ASM Oran players
Algerian Ligue Professionnelle 1 players
21st-century Algerian people